Party line or Party Line may refer to:

Party line (politics), the agenda of a political party
Party line (telephony), a system where multiple telephone customers are connected to the same phone line

Film and television
Party Line (film), a 1988 indie film
"Party Line" (SMW episode), a 1991 episode of Super Mario World
 "Party Line" (The Shield), a 2008 episode of The Shield

Music
Partyline, a Washington, D.C.-based band
"Party Line" (the Kinks song), 1966
"Party Line" (Andrea True Connection song), 1976
 "Party Line" (Wanessa song), 2010
 Party Line, a 1982 album by the Powder Blues Band
 "The Party Line", a 2015 song by Belle and Sebastian from Girls in Peacetime Want to Dance

Other uses
The Party Line (books), a series of books by Carrie Austen
The Party Line (radio), a topical sitcom on BBC Radio 4
 Party Line, a call-in radio program on WBTG AM 1290 in Sheffield, Alabama